Mick Hill (born 27 August 1978) is an Australian basketball player who played for the Canberra Cannons and the Brisbane Bullets in the National Basketball League. He currently plays for the Knox Raiders in the SEABL.

References

1978 births
Living people
Australian men's basketball players
Brisbane Bullets players
Canberra Cannons players
Shooting guards
Small forwards
Basketball players from Melbourne
20th-century Australian people
21st-century Australian people